Lognes is a railway station on RER train network in Lognes, Seine-et-Marne.

Description

History 
Lognes station opened on 19 December 1980, when RER line A was extended to Torcy.

Traffic 
, the estimated annual attendance by the RATP Group was 1,680,012 passengers.

Transport

Train 
During peak hours, there is a train to Paris every 10 minutes and a train to Marne-la-Vallée – Chessy every 15 minutes. At off-peak time, the average waiting time for trains to Paris and Marne-la-Vallée Chessy is 15 minutes. The first train to Paris leaves at 5 am, the last leaves at 0h30.

Bus connections 
The station is served by several buses:
 Sit'bus Bus network line: C (at remote bus stop called Rue de la Ferme) (to Pontault-Combault and to Noisiel) ;
  Noctilien network night bus line:  (at remote bus stop called Cours des Lacs) (between Paris (Gare de Lyon) and Marne-la-Vallée–Chessy - Disneyland).

References

Réseau Express Régional stations
Railway stations in France opened in 1980
Railway stations in Seine-et-Marne